Unguiculariopsis is a genus of lichenicolous fungi in the family Cordieritidaceae. It has 29 species.

Species
 Unguiculariopsis acerina 
 Unguiculariopsis acrocordiae 
 Unguiculariopsis adirondacensis 
 Unguiculariopsis ahtii 
 Unguiculariopsis australiensis 
 Unguiculariopsis caespitosa 
 Unguiculariopsis changbaiensis 
 Unguiculariopsis damingshanica 
 Unguiculariopsis dimorpha 
 Unguiculariopsis godroniicola 
 Unguiculariopsis groenlandiae 
 Unguiculariopsis hamatopilosa 
 Unguiculariopsis helmutii 
 Unguiculariopsis hysterigena 
 Unguiculariopsis ilicincola 
 Unguiculariopsis lesdainii 
 Unguiculariopsis lettaui 
 Unguiculariopsis livida 
 Unguiculariopsis lucaniae 
 Unguiculariopsis macrocarpa 
 Unguiculariopsis manriquei 
 Unguiculariopsis parasitica 
 Unguiculariopsis peltigericola 
 Unguiculariopsis ravenelii 
 Unguiculariopsis refractiva 
 Unguiculariopsis rehmii 
 Unguiculariopsis thallophila 
 Unguiculariopsis triregia

References

External links

Helotiales
Leotiomycetes genera
Taxa described in 1909
Taxa named by Heinrich Rehm
Fungi